Douglas Leonard Holmquist (October 4, 1941, in Bridgeport, Connecticut – February 27, 1988, in Altamonte Springs, Florida) was an American minor league baseball player and manager, as well as Major League Baseball coach for the New York Yankees.

At the collegiate level, Holmquist coached at Sacred Heart University (1968), the University of Vermont (1969 to 1971), and started the baseball program at the Florida Technological University, coaching there from 1973 to 1975. In 1970, he coached collegiate summer baseball in the Cape Cod Baseball League, leading the Chatham Anglers.

His entire seven-year managerial career was spent in the Yankees farm system. He served for four years at their Class A Fort Lauderdale Yankees of the Florida State League, then a year at the Class A Greensboro Hornets of the South Atlantic League, and then a year at their Double-A Nashville Sounds of the Southern League. After sitting out 1984 as skipper, Holmquist returned for a final year in 1985, managing the Triple-A Columbus Clippers of the International League. That year, he managed 22 games before being replaced by Stump Merrill. In 1984 and 1985, he was the first base coach for the major league Yankees, wearing #42. Holmquist died of a heart attack at age 46 in 1988.

References

External links

 
 

 
 

1941 births
1988 deaths
Major League Baseball first base coaches
New York Yankees coaches
Minor league baseball players
Fort Lauderdale Yankees managers
Nashville Sounds managers
Sacred Heart Pioneers baseball coaches
UCF Knights baseball coaches
Vermont Catamounts baseball coaches
Cape Cod Baseball League coaches